Detlef Knorrek (born 6 July 1965) is a German judoka. He competed at the 1992 Summer Olympics and the 1996 Summer Olympics. Detlef Knorrek won the Goodwill Games in Seattle in 1990 and 1994. He competed at Olympic Games and won bronze at the European Championships in 1991 in Prague U95kg. Knorrek won the World Cups in Munich, Basel and Rome. Bronze at the TIVP in 1992 and 1993. World team silver in 1994.

References

External links
 

1965 births
Living people
German male judoka
Olympic judoka of Germany
Judoka at the 1992 Summer Olympics
Judoka at the 1996 Summer Olympics
Sportspeople from Lower Saxony
Competitors at the 1990 Goodwill Games
Competitors at the 1994 Goodwill Games
20th-century German people
21st-century German people